Newington Football Club (previously known as Newington Youth Club) is a semi-professional Northern Irish football club playing in NIFL Championship. The club originates from the Newington area of Belfast and ground shares with NIFL Premiership side Cliftonville.

Current squad

player|no=|nat=NIR|pos=DF|name Joshua Diver}}

History

The club was formed in north Belfast as Jubilee Olympic Football Club in 1979 and joined the Dunmurry League in 1980. The club changed its name to Newington Youth Club in 1986, won its first trophy—the Breen Cup—in 1987 and became the dominant team in the Dunmurry League for the remainder of their affiliation. In 1990–91 Newington became the first Dunmurry League club to win the County Antrim Junior Shield.

The club joined the Northern Amateur League in 1994. They played in Division 2C and won five trophies, including the league title in their first season. The following season saw them win Division 2B, gaining promotion to the top junior division of the Amateur League in the process.

Their greatest achievement in junior football came on 1 May 1997 when they won the biggest prize in junior football – Irish FA Junior Cup. Newington defeated Fermanagh team Lisbellaw United in the final. A Division 2A title followed and soon the club was elevated to intermediate status, gaining a place in Division 1B in 2000. Newington continued to go from strength to strength, winning 1B at the first attempt, followed by the Division 1A title in 2001–02. However, Newington's facilities at their home ground (Muckamore Park, Antrim) failed meet the required standards to gain promotion to the Amateur League Premier Division.

In 2004–05, Newington reached the quarter-finals of the Steel & Sons Cup, automatically qualifying for the County Antrim Shield; and their first match against senior opposition. A 2–0 defeat at Lisburn Distillery. At the end of that season, the club finished runners-up in Division 1A, but recent improvements to Muckamore Park meant that this time promotion to the Premier Division was realised.

In 2005–06, only eleven years after joining the League in its lowest division, Newington won the Amateur League title (and Border Cup) at the first time of asking. This season also saw the club reach the quarter-finals of the Irish Cup, losing out to Larne. In 2007–08, the club reached the semi-finals of the Irish Intermediate Cup, and in 2008–09 won the Amateur League title for the second time.

On 14 January 2012 the club managed what the BBC described as "one of the biggest shocks in Irish Cup history" when they defeated Glentoran 1–0 in the fifth round at the east Belfast giants' own ground, The Oval. Rated 20–1 by bookmakers to win the match, the club triumphed through Neil Quinn's goal and were drawn to face Dungannon Swifts in the sixth round.

On 24 May 2013, the biggest game in the club's history to date, they achieved promotion to NIFL Championship 2, the third tier of national football. They faced Mid-Ulster Football League champions Dollingstown in a two-legged play-off for promotion, and won the tie on the away goals rule after it finished 4–4 on aggregate. A 3–2 away defeat followed by a 2–1 home win was enough to seal promotion.

After previously being known as Newington Youth F.C., the club are now known as Newington Football Club.

Grounds
The club originates in the Newington area of Belfast, although owing to the lack of facilities for junior and intermediate clubs in north Belfast they have played home matches at Muckamore Park in Antrim, at Brantwood FC on Skegoneill Avenue, Richardson Park in Dunmurry, and The Cliff in Larne. In 2008, the club became involved in a partnership with IFA Premiership club Crusaders, with a view to securing funding for a new, shared ground in north Belfast. As part of the arrangement, Newington used Crusaders’ ground Seaview for home matches in 2008–09, marking a return to home matches in the club's native north Belfast. From the 2013–14 season, the club's first season in NIFL Championship 2, until 2017–18, the club played at Seaview again. In 2018, the club moved to share Solitude with Cliftonville.

Honours

Intermediate honours
 NIFL Premier Intermediate League: 1
 2021-22
  Steel & Sons Cup: 2
 2017–18, 2021-22
  Northern Amateur League: 5
 2005–06, 2008–09, 2009–10, 2010–11, 2012–13
Border Cup: 1
 2005–06

Junior honours
  Irish Junior Cup: 1
 1996–97
  County Antrim Junior Shield: 1
 1990–91

Sources
 Newington Football Club, And if you know your history..., https://web.archive.org/web/20090514235835/http://www.newingtonyc.co.uk/history.html. Retrieved 14–05–09.

References

 

Association football clubs in Northern Ireland
Association football clubs established in 1979
Association football clubs in Belfast
1979 establishments in Northern Ireland
NIFL Premier Intermediate League clubs